Nu Nu (born 1 April 1999) is a Burmese footballer who plays as a midfielder for the Myanmar women's national team.

International goals
Scores and results list Myanmar's goal tally first.

References

1999 births
Living people
Women's association football midfielders
Burmese women's footballers
People from Magway Division
Myanmar women's international footballers